The list of ship commissionings in 1908 includes a chronological list of ships commissioned in 1908.  In cases where no official commissioning ceremony was held, the date of service entry may be used instead.


References

See also 

1908
 Ship commissionings
Ship commissionings
Ship commissionings